Andreas Beck and Dominik Meffert were the defending champions. but decided not to participate.

Radu Albot and Jaroslav Pospíšil won the title, defeating Thomas Fabbiano and Matteo Viola in the final, 7–6(9–7), 6–1.

Seeds

Draw

Draw

References
 Main Draw

Mersin Cup - Doubles
2014 Doubles